Cleiton Santana dos Santos (born on 24 May 2003), simply known as Cleiton, is a Brazilian professional footballer who plays as a central defender for Campeonato Brasileiro Série A club Flamengo.

Club career

Flamengo
Cleiton made his debut on the 26 January 2022, starting for Flamengo in the Campeonato Carioca 2–1 home win against Portuguesa-RJ.

Career statistics

References

External links

2003 births
Living people
Brazilian footballers
Association football defenders
Campeonato Brasileiro Série A players
CR Flamengo footballers